Andrea Di Paola (born 1970) is an Italian astronomer and a discoverer of minor planets.

He works at the Rome Observatory and has been significantly involved in the CINEOS project. He is credited by the Minor Planet Center with the co-discovery of 11 numbered minor planets during 1996–1997, all made in collaboration with Italian astronomer Andrea Boattini.

The main-belt asteroid 27130 Dipaola, discovered by Andrea Boattini and Maura Tombelli in 1998, is named in his honour. Naming citation was published on 6 August 2003.

References

External links 
 Asteroid (27130) Dipaola

1970 births
Discoverers of asteroids

20th-century Italian astronomers
Living people